Matthaeus Mac Cathasaig  was a bishop in Ireland during the late 13th and early 14th centuries.

The Chancellor of Armagh,  he was consecrated Bishop of Clogher in Lisgoole Abbey  on 29 June 1287 and served until his death in 1310.

References

13th-century Roman Catholic bishops in Ireland
14th-century Roman Catholic bishops in Ireland
Pre-Reformation bishops of Clogher
1310 deaths